Howard James "Jay" Triano (born September 21, 1958) is a Canadian basketball coach and former professional player, who is currently an assistant coach for the Sacramento Kings of the National Basketball Association (NBA). He previously served as the head coach of the NBA's Toronto Raptors and the interim head coach of the Phoenix Suns. A former Canadian national team player who competed in two Olympics, he has also had two stints as head coach of the national team.

Early life and family
Triano was born in Tillsonburg, Ontario and raised in Niagara Falls, Ontario, where he attended A. N. Myer Secondary School. He is of Italian descent through his great-grandfather, who landed on Ellis Island, then made his way to Welland, Ontario. His younger brother Jeff was a draft pick of the Toronto Maple Leafs in the 1982 NHL Entry Draft, after playing OHL hockey for the Toronto Marlboros. Brady Heslip, his nephew and son of his sister Jody, played basketball at Baylor University and  played for the Canadian national team.

Playing career
As a student at Simon Fraser University, the 6 ft 4 in, 194 lb Triano broke or equalled eleven school men's basketball records, including having the most career points with 2,616. At Simon Fraser, he befriended Canadian athlete and activist Terry Fox. He was drafted in the eighth round of the 1981 NBA Draft by the Los Angeles Lakers, but was cut during training camp and never played in the NBA. The same year, he was also drafted by the Calgary Stampeders in the sixth round of the 1981 CFL Draft.

Triano was a national team player from 1977 to 1988, captained the team from 1981 to 1988, and played in the 1984 and 1988 Olympics. He led the Canadian team that won Gold at the 1983 World University Games in Edmonton, Alberta, defeating the United States in the semi-finals, which was led by Karl Malone and Charles Barkley, and Yugoslavia in the final, led by Dražen Petrović. He played three seasons of professional basketball, two in Mexico and one (1985–86 season for Fenerbahçe Istanbul) in Turkey.

Coaching career
After retiring as a player in 1988, Triano became head coach at his alma mater, Simon Fraser. He attempted to recruit high school star Steve Nash and later served as his mentor. In 1995, when the nearby Vancouver Grizzlies debuted, he became team Director of Community Relations and worked as the colour commentator for their radio broadcasts. In 1998, Triano became the head coach of the Canadian men's national basketball team. He coached the Nash-led team to a 5–2 record and a seventh-place finish in the 2000 Sydney Olympics, losing to France by five points in the quarter-finals. Two years later, he became an assistant coach for the Toronto Raptors, becoming the second Canadian-born coach in the NBA. He served under Lenny Wilkens, Kevin O'Neill, and Sam Mitchell.

In 2004, Triano was fired as national team head coach, and replaced by Leo Rautins the following year.

In 2008, Triano was named an assistant coach for United States national team. On February 13, 2008, Triano served as head coach of the Toronto Raptors in their 109–91 victory over the New Jersey Nets, in place of head coach Sam Mitchell, who was absent from the team as a result of the death of his father-in-law, making history as the first Canadian to serve as head coach for a regular-season NBA game.

On December 3, 2008, Triano was named interim head coach of the Raptors after Mitchell was relieved of his coaching duties. He became the first Canadian-born head coach in NBA history and first Canadian head coach in NBA history. Triano guided the Raptors to a 25–40 mark.

On May 12, 2009, Triano was given a three-year deal to remain head coach of the Raptors.

In Triano's first full season as the Raptors head coach in the 2009–10 season, Toronto missed the playoffs by one game to the Chicago Bulls, going 2–5 in their last 7 games.  The team finished 40–42.

In the 2010–11 season, without Chris Bosh on the roster, Triano led the Raptors to a dismal 22–60 record.

On June 1, 2011, the Raptors announced they would not be picking up the option on Triano's contract, but gave him another position within the organization, the Vice-President of Pro Scouting.

On August 17, 2012, Triano was named as an assistant coach for the Portland Trail Blazers. The following week, Triano was also named head coach of Canada's national team for the second time in his career.

On May 18, 2016, it was announced that Triano would take on the associate head coach role (lead assistant) for the Phoenix Suns. He was reunited with head coach Earl Watson, who played for the Trail Blazers during his final season in the NBA, and was considered a major influence on transitioning to being a full-time coach. The subsequent hiring of Turkish-born Mehmet Okur to the Suns' coaching staff as a player development coach on September 13 in the same year, marked the first time in franchise history that multiple non-American coaches served on the coaching staff in the same season.

On October 22, 2017, after a 0–3 start to the season, including one of the worst losses in Suns history and the worst loss to open up a regular season in league history, Triano was promoted to interim head coach of the Suns after the firing of Earl Watson. In his first game as head coach since 2011, Triano guided the team, which had suffered 40+ point losses earlier in the year, to leads as much as 22 points before winning 117–115 on October 23, against the Sacramento Kings for their first win of the season. On December 26, 2017, Triano became the first foreign born head coach in NBA history to win 100 games in the league with a 99–97 win over the Memphis Grizzlies. However, the Suns would finish the season with a 21–58 record under his tenure, and he did not return as head coach after that season. On May 24, 2018, the Charlotte Hornets announced that Triano would join their staff as lead assistant coach.

On May 20, 2022, NBA beat writer Marc Stein reported that Triano would join the Sacramento Kings as an assistant coach for the upcoming 2022-23 NBA season.

Head coaching record

|- 
| align="left"|Toronto
| align="left"|
| 65||25||40|||| align="center"|4th in Atlantic||—||—||—||—
| align="center"|Missed playoffs
|-
| align="left"|Toronto
| align="left"|
| 82||40||42|||| align="center"|2nd in Atlantic||—||—||—||—
| align="center"|Missed playoffs
|-
| align="left"|Toronto
| align="left"|
| 82||22||60|||| align="center"|5th in Atlantic||—||—||—||—
| align="center"|Missed playoffs
|-
| align="left"|Phoenix
| align="left"|
| 79||21||58|||| align="center"|5th in Pacific||—||—||—||—
| align="center"|Missed playoffs
|-class="sortbottom"
! colspan="2"|Career
! 308||108||200|||| ||—||—||—||—||

See also
 List of foreign NBA coaches

Sources

External links
 NBA.com profile
 Basketball-Reference.com profile
 Niagara Falls Hall of Fame profile
 Jay Triano Brings Experience and Much More to the Trail Blazers Coaching Staff

1958 births
Living people
Basketball people from Ontario
Basketball players at the 1984 Summer Olympics
Basketball players at the 1988 Summer Olympics
Canadian expatriate basketball people in Turkey
Canadian expatriate basketball people in the United States
Canadian expatriate basketball people in Mexico
Canadian football defensive backs
Canadian men's basketball coaches
Canadian men's basketball players
1978 FIBA World Championship players
1982 FIBA World Championship players
Canadian people of Italian descent
Canadian radio sportscasters
Canadian television sportscasters
Charlotte Hornets assistant coaches
Fenerbahçe men's basketball players
Guards (basketball)
Los Angeles Lakers draft picks
Medalists at the 1983 Summer Universiade
Medalists at the 1985 Summer Universiade
National Basketball Association broadcasters
Olympic basketball players of Canada
Phoenix Suns assistant coaches
Phoenix Suns head coaches
Players of Canadian football from Ontario
Portland Trail Blazers assistant coaches
Sportspeople from Tillsonburg
Simon Fraser Clan men's basketball players
Simon Fraser Clan football players
Sportspeople from Niagara Falls, Ontario
Toronto Raptors assistant coaches
Toronto Raptors head coaches
Vancouver Grizzlies announcers
Universiade medalists in basketball
Universiade gold medalists for Canada
Universiade bronze medalists for Canada